(January 11, 1893 – January 23, 1979) was a Japanese music critic. He is considered a pioneer of music criticism in Japan.

Biography

Early life
Ōtaguro was born in Tokyo, on January 11, 1893.

Career
After graduating from high school, Ōtaguro went abroad to study economics at the London School of Economics from 1913 to 1914. He attended many concerts of contemporary music during his time in London. He became acquainted with works by English contemporaries such as Frederick Delius and Ralph Vaughan Williams as well as other European composers such as Claude Debussy and Alexander Scriabin. He went back to Japan in July 1914 for a summer vacation but was unable to return to London due to the outbreak of World War I. Starting his career as a music writer, he published his first two books in 1915. One of these was From Bach to Schoenberg, which covered sixty European composers and was the first Japanese book to cover modern composers such as Arnold Schoenberg and Claude Debussy.

From 1915 to 1917, Ōtaguro held private concerts in his Ōmori-sannō mansion, where he played contemporary pieces on his own piano, despite not being a professional musician. These concerts were held for an audience of about 20 people, including composer  and critic . Despite their small and private audiences, the concerts had programs printed elaborately by Kiyoshi Hasegawa, who lived in Ōmori-sannō at the time. Ōtaguro held a piano concert at the Tokyo YMCA center titled "Scriabin–Debussy Evening" on December 9, 1916. This was the first concert in Japan dedicated to either of the composers' music.

In 1916, Ōtaguro started the publishing company . It published books and a magazine titled Ongaku to Bungaku, which ran until 1919. He revised and compiled essays he wrote for the magazine into multiple books.

He was a founding member of the photography group Photographic Art Society, which was active from 1921 to 1924. Other members of the group included Shinzō and Rosō Fukuhara. The society was affiliated with a magazine, Shashin geijutsu, published from June 1921 until September 1923; Ōtaguro contributed an article, "Shashin shoron", to its first issue. His photography career was short lived, and he did not get much recognition as a photographer.

After World War II, he made appearances on the NHK radio quiz show .

Ōtaguro was recognized as a Person of Cultural Merit, one of Japan's highest honors, in 1977.

Death
Ōtaguro died at 86 from cholangiocarcinoma at the Tokyo Welfare Pension Hospital (now ) on January 23, 1979. He was hospitalized since September the preceding year.

Parts of his residence in Suginami, where he lived since 1933, were transformed into an urban park called Ōtaguro Park, which opened on October 1, 1981.

Ōtaguro's personal collection of books, sheet music, and other material was donated to the NHK by his daughter. The collection was transferred to the Documentation Center of Modern Japanese Music on September 24, 1998. In July 2010, the entire collection of the Documentation Center was transferred to the Meiji Gakuin University's Archives of Modern Japanese Music.

Writings

Translations
In addition to his own writing, Ōtaguro translated many books on music, starting in 1919 with Music on Water, a collection of translated essays by various writers.

Ōtaguro's translated works by several English and French composers, as well as historical biographies about composers. Biographies translated by him included works such as André Pirro's biography about Johann Sebastian Bach, which was the first biographic book about Bach published in Japan, and Marie Bobillier's biography of Joseph Haydn.

Poetry
Ōtaguro published a few books of his own poetry, including Haru no enbu, and Nichirin. He also published poetry in the magazine Kamen.

Ōtaguro wrote the lyrics for Dan Ikuma's song cycle Tōkyō shōkei.

Personal life
Ōtaguro married his wife, Chizue Hirota, in 1919.

Ōtaguro's other keen interests included baseball, sumō, detective stories, and poetry.

Bibliography
Titles have been modified to use shinjitai kanji. Katakana transliterations of names are unmodified and reflect the original publication.

As author 

 1915, 
 1915, 
 1916, 
 1916, 
 1917, 
 1917, 
 1917, 
 1917, 
 1917, 
 1917, 
 1917, 
 1917, 
 1918, 
 1919, 
 1919, 
 1920, 
 1920, 
 1920, 
 1920, 
 1920, 
 1925, 
 1926, 
 1932, 
 1932, 
 1933, 
 1933, 
 1933, 
 1933, 
 1934, 
 1935, 
 1935, 
 1937, 
 1940, 
 1950, 
 1951, 
 1958, 
 1962, 
 1970,

As translator

 1919,  (collection of translated essays by Gerald Cumberland, Francis Grierson, Cyril Scott, Lawrence Gilman and Carl Van Vechten, also including two of Ōtaguro's essays)
 1920, Gerald Cumberland: Set Down in Malice: A Book of Reminiscences
 1920, 
 1925, Adam Carse: The History of Orchestration
 1926, Cyril Scott: The Philosophy of Modernism, in its Connection with Music (
 1926, Romain Rolland: 
 1928, Romain Rolland: 
 1928, Jean Cocteau: Le Coq et l'Arlequin
 1930, Cecil Gray: The History of Music
 1930, Romain Rolland: 
 1930, Cecil Gray: Survey of Contemporary Music
 1931, Paul Bekker: Beethoven
 1931, Claude Debussy: Monsieur Croche, antidilettante
 1931, Claude Debussy: 
 1931, André Pirro: Jean-Sébastien Bach
 1932, Michel Brenet: Haydn
 1933, : Mozart (
 1936, Igor Stravinsky: Chronicle of My Life
 1937, Constant Lambert: Music Ho! A Study of Music in Decline
 1938, Michel-Dimitri Calvocoressi: 
 1938, George Dyson: 
 1939, William Murdoch:  Chopin: His Life
 1940, Felix Weingartner: Lebenserinnerungen
 1942, Cecil Gray: Predicaments: Or Music and the Future

Explanatory notes

References

Citations

Works cited

 
 
 
 
 
 
 
 
 
 
 
 
 
 
 
 
 
 
 
 
 
 
 

1893 births
1979 deaths
Deaths from cholangiocarcinoma
Japanese music critics
Classical music critics
Japanese photographers
20th-century photographers
20th-century Japanese translators
Persons of Cultural Merit